The Employment Department is the agency of the government of the U.S. state of Oregon which is responsible for administration of the state's unemployment insurance program, operation of a statewide employment service through a system of public employment offices, statistical research and reporting to assist job development in both the public and private sector, and provision oversight, certification, and technical assistance to providers of child care.

Although the agency as it exists today was created in 1993 by the Oregon Legislative Assembly, its history dates back to the 1913 opening of the first public employment office within the state by the City of Portland, and incorporates programs of the previous Oregon State Employment Service (established in 1935) and other state agencies.

Oregon Labor Market Information System
The Employment Department maintains a website, the Oregon Labor Market Information System (OLMIS), also called "QualityInfo.org" (http://www.qualityinfo.org). The site was built by Oregon economists, and is based in part on a database developed as part of America's Workforce Information Database. QualityInfo.org allows electronic access to labor market information through articles and tools intended to provide labor market information to a wide range of audiences. Most of the Employment Department's Research division's publications are available online through QualityInfo.org If you're not sure what "Labor Market Information" is exactly, you can read an article on QualityInfo.org titled "Labor Market Information: The Key to Finding, Keeping Quality Workforce" that explains the basics of what it is and how it can be used.

References

General references

External links
 

Employment Department, Oregon
1935 establishments in Oregon